Watermeyer is a surname. Notable people with the surname include:

Egidius Benedictus Watermeyer (1824–1867), Cape Colony judge
Ernest Frederick Watermeyer (1880–1958), South African chief justice
Frederick Stephanus Watermeyer (1828-1864), Cape Colony journalist, advocate, and politician
Philip Johannes Andries Watermeyer (1825-1897), Cape Colony politician
Stefan Watermeyer (born 1988), South African rugby union player